Governador Valadares is a Brazilian municipality in the countryside of Minas Gerais. In 2020, its population was 281,046 inhabitants, thus being the ninth most populated city in the state. It is an economical axis of the middle valley of the Doce River (Rio Doce, lit. "Sweet River"), having a significant influence on the east and northeast portion of Minas Gerais and local authorities of the state of Espírito Santo. Governador Valadares sits on the bank of the Doce River (Rio Doce), 324 km from Belo Horizonte, the state's capital. Governador Valadares has an area of about 2 342 km2, being only 58 km2 of urban area.

The discovery of the city started at the beginning of the 16th century, that explored the Doce River searching for precious metals. The settlement began between the 18th and 19th centuries, constructing barracks destined to keep an eye at the Amerindians, who used to attack the settlers and merchants. With the construction of the EFVM (Vitória-Minas Railway), in 1907, the settlements were consolidated. The growth of the population and commercial development was improved due to the location of the city, that was near to coffee farms and wood extraction fields. The municipality was emancipated from Peçanha in the 1930s.

After the 1940s, the extraction of precious metals brought a notable population growth, along with livestock and commerce. But with the decline of natural resources, the money could only be earned through the investment of immigrants, who would later go to other countries. Commerce is the most important source of income in the city, along with agribusiness and regional manufactured products.

Geography
According to the modern (2017) geographic classification by Brazil's National Institute of Geography and Statistics (IBGE), the city is the main municipality in the Intermediate Geographic Region of Governador Valadares.

Until 2017, Governador Valadares was a statistical micro-region including 25 municipalities:  Alpercata, Campanário, Capitão Andrade, Coroaci, Divino das Laranjeiras, Engenheiro Caldas, Fernandes Tourinho, Frei Inocêncio, Galiléia, Governador Valadares, Itambacuri,  Itanhomi, Jampruca, Marilac, Mathias Lobato, Nacip Raydan, Nova Módica, Pescador, São Geraldo da Piedade, São Geraldo do Baixio, São José da Safira, São José do Divino, Sobrália, Tumiritinga, and Virgolândia.  Its population (2006) was estimated by the IBGE to be  407,815 inhabitants in a total area of 11, 327 km2.

Climate
Temperature:
Annual average: 32.6 °C [90.7 °F] 
Annual maximum average: 40.7 °C [105.3 °F]
Annual minimum average: 18.3 °C [65 °F]

Average annual rainfall index:  1,350 mm

History

Colonization of the region 
Today's location of the municipality of Governador Valadares was found to be inhabited by Amerindians for at least 10 thousand years and registers from the first explorers of the region after Brazil's discovery, in 1500, provides us information that they were still numerous on that occasion. The exploration of this region began in the 16th century, with expeditions like the ones from Sebastião Fernandes Tourinho, that went by the Rio Doce route in the search for precious metals. Fernandes Tourinho went through the inverse route of the river until finding the Santo Antônio River, but the settlement was prohibited on the beginning of the 17th century, due to the efforts to not having ways to have illegal gold extraction on the Diamantina, Minas Gerais region.

The settlement was allowed on 1755 and to guarantee to safety of the colonizers and merchants that used the Doce River, barracks were installed with the mission to keep an eye on the Botocudos. The barrack of Baguari was the first territory of today's municipality and along with him, near settlements also appeared, one of them being Figueira, that correspond to today's municipality. The Amerindians were seen as a threat to the colonizers and the barracks worked as a strategy of forcing them to leave the region. Near Figueira, in 1818, the D.Manoel barrack was created, on the left side of the Doce River, working as a little port that attended to military service and would also form a trading post. Later, the settlement was ranked up to a district subjected to Peçanha by the provincial law nº 3.198 of September 23 of 1884, coming to be called Santo Antônio da Figueira.

General information 
The area around Governador Valadares was explored in colonial serve the residences of the town.  It was powered by steam.

1923 – Figueira

In 1937, the municipality of Figueira do Rio Doce was established, which then changed its name to Governador Valadares, in honor of the governor at the time, Benedito Valadares.

Since the 1980s, Governador Valadares is known as one of the main sources of Brazilian immigrants to the United States, even earning the nickname "Governador Valadolares" in reference to expatriates sending remittances of their dollar salaries.  However, the late 2000s recession made many of the Valadares immigrants to return home since financial security became worse in the United States.

Economy
Production and the intense trade in precious stones is the reason the "Brazil Gem Show" takes place in the local authority every year: an event that consists of the commerce of precious stones with Brazilians and foreign visitors

Governador Valadares is the biggest city and commercial center of the Eastern region of the state of Minas Gerais, having several cities in its area of influence, such as Teófilo Otoni and Caratinga. At present, Governador Valadares is growing in industrial development, due to its strategic position, human resources and international reputation.

It is a trade and industrial center. Sawmills and food-processing plants are in the city, and mica and beryl are mined in the area. Governador Valadares is one of the most famous gem-trading centres in Brazil. Gem minerals include amethyst, chrysoberyl, brazilianite, topaz and quartz. The Golconda mine, one of the oldest in the city, attracts the curiosity of tourists and stone collectors from all over the world.

Transportation
The city is served by the railroad Vitória-Minas, of Vale S.A. and by the highway Rio-Bahia (BR-116). It is also connected with the capital of the state by the BR-381.

The city is on the Belo Horizonte–Vitória railway and on the Rio de Janeiro–Salvador highway. 
Distances from major centers:

Belo Horizonte – 311 km 
Rio de Janeiro – 580 km
São Paulo – 891 km
Brasília – 1,045 km
Vitória – 420 km

Sport
The city hosts of one of the stages of the Brazilian hang gliding championship from the peak of Ibituruna, where it is possible to catch sight of the whole valley of Rio Doce.  It also hosts several international hang gliding championships.

The city is known internationally for the World Paragliding Championships that has been held at Ibituruna Peak (1123 meters).

Sister cities
Governador Valadares is twinned with the following cities: 
  Framingham, Massachusetts, United States
  Everett, Massachusetts, United States
  Newark, New Jersey, United States
 Bridgeport, Connecticut, United States

Notable people
Ernane Rezende Borges Ferreira, footballer.
Eike Batista, entrepreneur.

References

External links
Portal de Governador Valadares
Official city government site
City Brazil-Governador Valadares
Governador Valadares

Municipalities in Minas Gerais
Populated places established in 1808